Shundexueyuan railway station, is an elevated station of Guangzhou-Zhuhai Intercity Railway.

The station is located at Fengshapian, Daliang Subdistrict, Shunde District, Foshan, Guangdong Province, China, near Shunde Polytechnic. It is at the east of Bigui Lu, the west of Desheng Lu and in the middle of Guangzhou-Zhuhai Expressway West Line and Nanguo Donglu, near Lijiasha Channel and Guipan Sea. The line started operation on 7 January 2011, but the opening date for the station was two years later, on 1 February 2013.

Foshan Metro
It is served by Line 3 of the Foshan Metro.

References

Shunde District
Railway stations in China opened in 2013